Beatriz Dias Monteiro (born 23 December 2005) is a Portuguese badminton player. She competed in the Women's singles SU5 event at the 2020 Summer Paralympics. 

She competed at the 2019 Estonian U17 International.

Achievements

European Championships 
Women's singles

BWF Para Badminton World Circuit (1 runner-up) 
The BWF Para Badminton World Circuit – Grade 2, Level 1, 2 and 3 tournaments has been sanctioned by the Badminton World Federation from 2022.

Women's singles

International Tournaments (1 runner-up) 
Women's singles

References

External links 

 Jogos Paralímpicos 2020: Badminton - Beatriz Monteiro | ENTR PT
 beatriz monteiro badminton - Bing images

Living people
2005 births
Sportspeople from Lisbon
Portuguese female badminton players
Portuguese para-badminton players
Badminton players at the 2020 Summer Paralympics